The 1991–92 Crvena zvezda season is the 47th season in the existence of the club. The team played in the YUBA League.

Overview

Players

Squad information

Transactions

Players In

|}

Players Out

|}

Competitions

Overall

Overview

YUBA League

Regular season

Matches

Play-off

Source

Yugoslav Cup

Source

Statistics

YUBA League (Regular Season)

References

External links
 KK Crvena zvezda official website

KK Crvena Zvezda seasons
Crvena zvezda